"limonada" is the second episode of the third season of the American dark comedy crime television series Barry. It is the 18th overall episode of the series and was written by series co-creators Alec Berg and Bill Hader, and directed by Hader, who also serves as the main lead actor. It was first broadcast on HBO in the United States on May 1, 2022, and also was available on HBO Max on the same date.

The series follows Barry Berkman, a hitman from Cleveland who travels to Los Angeles to kill someone but finds himself joining an acting class taught by Gene Cousineau, where he meets aspiring actress Sally Reed and begins to question his path in life as he deals with his criminal associates such as Monroe Fuches and NoHo Hank. In the episode, Barry decides to get an acting job for Gene in an attempt to give him a new purpose while Gene wants to escape. Meanwhile, Cristobal's criminal father-in-law arrives and his presence threatens his relationship with Hank.

According to Nielsen Media Research, the episode was seen by an estimated 0.294 million household viewers and gained a 0.06 ratings share among adults aged 18–49. The episode received critical acclaim, with critics praising the performances (particularly Hader and Winkler), writing, directing, tension, character development and ending.

Plot
Barry (Bill Hader) buys food for Gene (Henry Winkler), forcing him to eat and stay in the trunk of his car. He then visits Sally (Sarah Goldberg) in the writers' room for her new series, hoping that she could get a role for Gene and give him a purpose in life. However, Sally states that her bosses don't want to work with Gene, deeming him "past his time" and difficult to work with. Barry then has a nervous breakdown and viciously screams at her in front of everyone before leaving.

Desperate, Barry asks casting director Allison Jones to get an audition for Gene. She states that Gene is too difficult to work with but gives Barry an audition for a TV series. Meanwhile, as Cristobal (Michael Irby) is about to buy lemonade from kids across the street, black SUVs suddenly intercept him. His father-in-law, crime lord Fernando (Miguel Sandoval), steps out and greets him. He takes him to an Airbnb, stating that he wants Cristobal to aid in eliminating the Chechens (believing they were responsible for the shooting at the monastery) and then go back home to his wife and kids, making Cristobal feel nervous about Hank (Anthony Carrigan).

Barry's outburst seems to distract Sally while at rehearsal. One of her colleagues, Katie (Elsie Fisher), wants to report Barry, but there is nothing she can do since Barry does not work on the series and there was no physical violence during his outburst. To complicate matters, a similar series that deals with abuse will premiere soon, so the network decided to move up the premiere of Joplin and wants Sally to start doing press. That night, Fernando's henchmen raid Hank's plant shop, but Hank and his men managed to leave in time thanks to a tip from Cristobal. Hank and Cristobal meet at their house, where Cristobal tells him to flee as Fernando will kill him, ending their relationship.

After Barry auditions for his role, he asks for a role for Gene. He is informed that Gene earned a bad reputation in the industry after he brought a real gun to the Full House set and insulted Jones when he failed to get a role in Family Ties. Barry then proclaims that Gene helped him in finding himself through his class, and his speech convinces the casting directors to get a role for Gene and himself. He then calls Sally to tell her the news; she apologizes for being dismissive earlier, but Barry just brushes it off and doesn't acknowledge his own explosive outburst, leaving her speechless. Then, as he opens the trunk, he discovers that Gene has escaped.

Gene runs through the suburbs, jumping through the fences. In one instance, he is attacked by a pack of dogs in a backyard. He then reaches a waitress outside a shop to ask for help. She doubts his story and pretends to get him a taxi through a phone before going back inside. Gene then sees Barry heading towards him and starts running, when another car suddenly crashes with Barry's car. Gene then flees to his house but is shocked to discover that Barry is already there. While Leo (Andrew Leeds) leaves the room, Barry informs Gene about their new roles, telling him to seize this second chance or he will kill Leo and his grandson. Gene silently agrees. Barry then states he loves Gene and asks if he feels the same way. Gene nods, so Barry requests him to say "Yes" aloud, then asks him to say it again.

Production

Development
In April 2022, the episode's title was revealed as "limonada" and it was announced that series co-creators Alec Berg and Bill Hader had written the episode while Hader had directed it. This was Berg's eighth writing credit, Hader's eighth writing credit, and Hader's seventh directing credit.

Writing
Bill Hader explained that Barry sparing Gene's life was a result of caring for him, stating "I think he loves Gene. He really cares about him and he doesn't want to do this. It's another Chris situation. The two people Barry truly loves is Cousineau and Sally. He cares about them more than anything."

Regarding Barry's outburst and lack of apologizing to Sally, Hader said that he wanted the scene to escalate from Katie's character's perception and highlight the uncertainty of the situation with Sally's laugh. Originally, there would be scenes with Katie seeing Sally texting Barry to question him about the scene, but the crew felt that the scene could be more properly told by adding reshoots to show her worry about Sally's relationship. On her storyline, Sarah Goldberg said, "In real time, when sexual harassment in the workplace happens, it's like your brain can't catch up with your body or vice versa. And I think that you don't necessarily react in the way that you think you might, and it's only later that you have the awareness and understanding of what happened."

The last scene was met with laughter by a test screening, something that Hader attributed to a more absurdist and comedic take on the scene. Hader claimed to have sent a new version of the script, which would end up being the final version of the episode.

Casting
Casting director Allison Jones guest stars as herself, having previously appeared in "The Audition". Jones' casting assistant, Ben Harris, also appears as himself in Barry's audition scene.

Reception

Viewers
The episode was watched by 0.294 million viewers, earning a 0.06 in the 18-49 rating demographics on the Nielson ratings scale. This means that 0.06 percent of all households with televisions watched the episode. This was a 18% increase from the previous episode, which was watched by 0.249 million viewers with a 0.04 in the 18-49 demographics.

Critical reviews
"limonada" received critical acclaim. The review aggregator website Rotten Tomatoes reported a 100% approval rating for the episode, based on 7 reviews with an average rating of 9.5/10.

David Cote of The A.V. Club gave the episode an "A-" and wrote, "We end on extreme close ups of a wet-eyed Barry saying, 'I love you, Mr. Cousineau. Do you love me?' Cousineau, face frozen in shock, nods. 'Can you say it?' 'I love you, Barry.' 'Can you say it again?' In this false-face world where performance corrupts every aspect of life, violence is improvised for a single take, but kindness has to be rehearsed."

Ben Rosenstock of Vulture gave the episode a perfect 5 star rating out of 5 and wrote, "Sally's obliviousness has been played for comedy until now, even as season two considerably deepened her character. But it becomes a source of drama in 'Limonada' when we learn that her relationship with Barry is not the same as the romance we once watched unfold." Nick Harley of Den of Geek gave the episode a 4.5 star rating out of 5 and wrote, "Season 3 of Barry is off to a wonderful, if terrifying start. Barry's behavior has never been more manic and threatening, but the show is still managing to be as funny as ever. Bill Hader also continues to be an absolute whiz behind the camera. He delivers two hilarious scenes by juxtaposing foreground and background action. It's savvy stuff, but we shouldn't expect anything less from this series at this point."

Accolades
TVLine named Bill Hader the "Performer of the Week" for the week of May 7, 2022, for his performance in the episode. The site wrote, "The line between comedy and drama is so thin here — at times, we're not even sure if we should be laughing or not — but Hader dances along that line like an expert circus performer. His stunning work on Barry this season is showing us a man at the very end of his rope... and that end is fraying quickly."

References

External links
 "limonada" at HBO
 

Barry (TV series) episodes
2022 American television episodes
Television episodes written by Bill Hader
Television episodes directed by Bill Hader